Erhan Kuşkapan (born June 8, 1988 in Yenimahalle, Turkey) is a Turkish footballer. He currently plays as a goalkeeper for Ankaraspor in the Süper Lig.

References

1988 births
Ankaraspor footballers
Living people
Turkish footballers
People from Yenimahalle

Association football goalkeepers